Paul M. Dorman High School is a high school located in Roebuck, South Carolina, United States. The school is part of Spartanburg County School District Six. It consists of a main campus for 10th-12th graders and a separate campus for 9th graders, and a College, Career, and Fine Arts Center. The center features an auditorium, multiple classrooms, an art gallery, kitchen, student center, and computer labs. The campus is located at the intersection of Interstate 26 and Highway 221 in Spartanburg County.

History

1985 hostage incident
On March 29, 1985, a fifteen year old freshman came to school with a loaded .38-caliber Colt revolver. Then teacher, Ms. Peggy Larson, who taught algebra, suspected one of her students of drinking and attempted to take him to the school's principal's office. The student then broke away, fled out a side door to his home. This student then returned to the school later the same day with his gun, and held four students hostage inside a classroom.

The incident lasted until a local pastor stepped into the classroom to talk down the student. The student was arrested, charged with four counts of kidnapping, and was then sent to Columbia, for a psychological evaluation. After that, the student was then sent to then Spartanburg General Hospital, now called Spartanburg Regional, psychiatric's unit. After being released, the student was placed on probation until his 21st birthday, as well as being barred from being on school grounds, or intimidating the victims of this incident. Due to the student's age, as he was a minor, his name was not released.

Athletics

State championships 
 Baseball: 1971, 2018
 Basketball - Boys: 2017, 2018, 2019, 2020
 Basketball - Girls: 2003, 2004, 2005
 Competitive Cheer: 2006, 2007
 Cross Country - Boys: 2002, 2008, 2017, 2018, 2019, 2020
 Cross Country - Girls: 2004, 2010, 2018
 Football: 2000, 2009
 Golf - Boys: 1998, 1999, 2007, 2008
 Golf - Girls: 2000, 2002, 2015
 Soccer - Boys: 2001
 Soccer - Girls: 2006
 Tennis - Boys: 2011
 Track - Boys: 2006, 2007, 2010, 2016, 2020
 Track - Girls: 2010
 Volleyball: 1990, 1991, 1992, 1995, 1996, 1997, 2000, 2001, 2003, 2004, 2009, 2016, 2017, 2021
 Wrestling: 2016

Notable alumni 
 Amber Brock (Class of 1998) – American author 
 J. J. Arcega-Whiteside (Class of 2015) – NFL wide receiver
 Lee Bright (Class of 1988) – former South Carolina State Senator  
 Toy Caldwell (Class of 1966) – musician and founding member of the Spartanburg-based Marshall Tucker Band
 Daja Dial (Class of 2011) – Miss South Carolina 2015 
 Terry Hughes (Class of 1967) – MLB third baseman
 Adam Humphries (Class of 2011) – NFL wide receiver 
 Shane Martin (Class of 1990) – member of the South Carolina Senate 
 Charone Peake (Class of 2011) – NFL wide receiver  
 Marcus Rowland (Class of 2008) – track and field sprinter, South Carolina High School 100 meter dash record holder 
 Ryan Sims (Class of 1998) – NFL defensive lineman and All-American in college for the North Carolina Tar Heels 
 Brandon Thomas (Class of 2009) – NFL offensive lineman 
 Steven Tolleson (Class of 2002) – MLB infielder 
 D. J. Trahan (Class of 1999) – professional golfer on PGA Tour

See also 
 List of high schools in South Carolina
 Spartanburg County School District 6

References

External links 
 Spartanburg County School District Six

Public high schools in South Carolina
Schools in Spartanburg County, South Carolina